Lockstead is a community in the Canadian province of New Brunswick. It is situated in Blackville, a parish of Northumberland County.

History

Notable people

See also
List of communities in New Brunswick

References

Communities in Northumberland County, New Brunswick